Todesco may refer to:

People
 Francisco Todesco (born 1937), Brazilian rower
 Hayley Todesco, Canadian inventor

Places
 Palais Todesco, Vienna, Austria